Certa Ireland (formerly Emo) is an Irish oil distribution brand that is based in Portlaoise, Republic of Ireland. The Certa Ireland brand is owned by DCC Plc which also has operations in Northern Ireland and Great Britain. DCC Oil Ireland, which included the brand Emo rebranded as Certa in September 2022.

Operations in the Republic of Ireland
Certa Ireland operates out of several regional depots and petrol filling stations throughout the Republic of Ireland. Emo significantly expanded its operations in 1999, to include retail from filling stations with the purchase of the Burmah Fuels filling station network. Recently, Emo Oil had celebrated its 35th birthday.

DCC plc also own the nominally competing filling station franchise GreatGas, having bought it in 2009. However, there appears to be no plans to integrate this with Certa, as new GreatGas locations have continued to open - in particular at unmanned locations.

DCC plc  also purchased the filling station operations of Tesco Ireland in 2020, These are now branded under Certa.

Certa Ireland supplies all grades of oil to several sectors including distributors, petrol stations, commercial enterprises and direct to home heating oil users. Their coverage currently includes Dublin, Limerick, Westmeath, Mayo, Meath, Offaly, Kildare, Carlow, Kilkenny and Laois. The company offers 24-hour delivery, co-operative and helpful drivers, aftercare services, online ordering, and the option to pay through the post office or any Post Point location (a service currently unique to Certa Ireland). The current managing director of Certa Ireland is Andrew Graham.

Operations in Northern Ireland
In Northern Ireland, Emo Oil is a high-profile brand name of DCC Energy Ltd, an energy company based in Belfast with several regional depots across Northern Ireland. The current managing director for Emo Oil in Northern Ireland is Donal Murphy.

In 2011, DCC Energy bought Maxol Direct, the home heating side of Maxol in Northern Ireland, which was then incorporated into Emo Oil by 2012.

Operations in Great Britain

In Great Britain, Emo Oil (GB Oils) operates out of several depots and offices across England, Scotland and Wales. Like the rest of the group, this newest division has grown out of acquisitions. Most notable for this are Shell Direct and Scottish Fuels. The current Chief Executive of Emo Oil (GB) is Paul Vian.

References

External links
 Emo Oil International website
 Emo Oil in Ireland
 Emo Oil UK
 DCC Website
 Certa Ireland

Oil and gas companies of Northern Ireland
Oil companies of the Republic of Ireland